Rosa Parks Transit Station is an intermodal transit station in Downtown Jacksonville, Florida. It is operated by the Jacksonville Transportation Authority (JTA) as a station for the Jacksonville Skyway elevated people mover. It previously served as Jacksonville's main city bus station before being replaced by the Jacksonville Regional Transportation Center at LaVilla in May 2020. It is located on Hogan Street between State Street and Union Street, and is the Skyway's northern terminus. It is across the street from the Downtown campus of Florida State College at Jacksonville.

JTA plans to keep the station active as a hub for a smaller number of JTA routes, including the Red Line of the First Coast Flyer bus rapid transit system. The eastern half of the station was decommissioned and demolished in late 2020 to prepare for eventual transit-oriented development opportunities.

History 
The station was built in 1997 to serve as both a new bus station and the northern terminus of the new north–south segment of the Jacksonville Skyway, allowing access to the state college. Construction on the Skyway extension began in 1993, and coincided with the system's switch from Matra to Bombardier Transportation technology. The station became operational on December 15, 1997.

When the station served as Jacksonville's major bus transfer point, it featured eighteen bays for city buses at ground level. The elevated Skyway platform is located on a second level. The station was highly regarded and won awards for its architectural design.

After the Jacksonville Regional Transportation Center at LaVilla opened in May 2020, Rosa Parks Transt Station no longer served as the city's main bus station. Later that year, the eastern half of the station was decommissioned and demolished to prepare for eventual transit-oriented development opportunities. Nine of the station's bus bays remain standing, but as of 2023, only the three closest to the Skyway platform remain in use.

The next station on the line is James Weldon Johnson Park station to the south. Notable places within walking distance of the station include the Downtown Campus of Florida State College at Jacksonville and First Baptist Church of Jacksonville.

References 

Jacksonville Skyway stations
Railway stations in the United States opened in 1997
Bus stations in Florida
Downtown Jacksonville
Memorials to Rosa Parks
Laura Street
1997 establishments in Florida